Zhou Jian'an is a Chinese former volleyball player and current volleyball coach. Zhou  has been the head coach of the China men's national volleyball team since 2006.

References

1964 births
Living people
Chinese men's volleyball players
Chinese volleyball coaches
Place of birth missing (living people)
Asian Games medalists in volleyball
Volleyball players at the 1990 Asian Games
Volleyball players at the 1994 Asian Games
Volleyball players at the 1998 Asian Games
Volleyball players from Chongqing
Medalists at the 1990 Asian Games
Medalists at the 1994 Asian Games
Medalists at the 1998 Asian Games
Asian Games gold medalists for China
Asian Games silver medalists for China
Asian Games bronze medalists for China
Chinese expatriate sportspeople in Japan
20th-century Chinese people